Diego Valentín Gómez (born 26 June 2003) is an Argentine footballer currently playing as a centre-back for Vélez Sarsfield.

Career statistics

Club

Notes

References

2003 births
Living people
Footballers from Buenos Aires
Argentine footballers
Association football defenders
Argentine Primera División players
Club Atlético Vélez Sarsfield footballers